Julián Javier Delmás Germán (born 20 April 1995) is a Spanish professional footballer who plays for Málaga CF as a right back.

Club career
Delmás played youth football with Real Zaragoza. In 2014 he was loaned to Tercera División side Villanueva CF, making his senior debut with the club during the season.

Delmás returned to Zaragoza in July 2015, being assigned to the reserves also in the fourth level. On 6 June 2017, he renewed his contract until 2021 and was definitely promoted to the main squad ahead of the 2017–18 season.

Delmás made his professional debut on 18 August 2017, starting in a 0–1 away loss against CD Tenerife in the Segunda División. He scored his first professional goal on 3 December, netting the game's only in an away success over Sporting de Gijón.

On 19 September 2019, Delmás renewed his contract until 2023. The following 31 August, however, he signed a three-year deal with second division newcomers FC Cartagena.

On 22 December 2022, Delmás terminated his contract with the Efesé.

References

External links

1995 births
Living people
Footballers from Zaragoza
Spanish footballers
Association football defenders
Segunda División players
Tercera División players
Real Zaragoza B players
Real Zaragoza players
FC Cartagena footballers
Málaga CF players